The 2012–13 FAW Welsh Cup was the 126th season of the annual knockout tournament for competitive football teams in Wales. The 2012–13 tournament commenced on 18 August 2012, and will run until the final in May 2013. The winner of the Cup qualifies to the first qualifying round of the 2013–14 UEFA Europa League.

Qualifying round one
Qualifying Round One will be played on either Saturday 18th or Sunday 19 August 2012.

North

|}

South

 

 

 

 

|}

Qualifying round two
Qualifying Round Two will be played on either Saturday 8 or Sunday 9 September 2012.

North

|}

South

 

 

|}

Round one
Round One will be played on either Saturday 6 or Sunday 7 October 2012.

North

|}

South

|}

Round two
Round Two was played on either Saturday 10 or Sunday 11 November 2012.

North

|}

South

|}

Round three
Round Three will be played on either Saturday 8 or Sunday 9 December 2012.

|}

Round four
Round Four will be played on either Saturday 26th or Sunday 27 January 2013.

|}

Quarter-finals
The Quarter-finals were played on 1 and 2 March 2013.

|}

Semi-finals
The Semi-finals were played on 6 April 2013.

|}

References

2012-13
1